Our Lady of Aránzazu (Nuestra Señora de Aránzazu) is a Roman Catholic title of the image of the Blessed Virgin Mary venerated in San Mateo, Rizal, Philippines.

The image is widely known due to claims of miraculous healing and flood safety. It further retained its standing posture despite the controversy of its original image in Oñati, Spain being seated.  

Pope Francis granted a pontifical decree of canonical coronation on 17 June 2016. The coronation took place on 31 May 2017.

History 
 
The history of Christianity in San Mateo, Rizal dates back to the early Spanish era of 1596, when the Augustinians friars built the first settlements in the place.

On 29 August 1596, the first parish was built under and in honor of the patron Saint Matthew.

On 6 December 1696, the Jesuits came and gained control of the town. The history of the Nuestra Señora de Aránzazu (also known as Birhen ng Bayang San Mateo)  in San Mateo, Rizal dates back to the early Spanish era of 1705.

A Jesuit priest, Padre Juan de Echazabal, started the devotion to Our Lady of Aránzazu from Spain and changed the patron of the town from St. Matthew to Nuestra Señora de Aránzazu.

In 1716, a new church was constructed on the site of the current church and placed the church of San Mateo under the patronage of the Nuestra Señora de Aránzazu. The first image of the Virgin of Aránzazu was brought to the Philippines by a Spanish captain from the Basque region.

In 1732, the Dominican Order of Letran in Intramuros made effort in spreading the devotion to the Nuestra Señora de Aránzazu among Filipinos during the Spanish era.

The church was proclaimed as Diocesan Shrine and Parish of Nuestra Señora de Aránzazu on 16 July 2004.

Description
Mary, holding the Christ Child, is vested in imperial regalia, and holds an apple symbolising her role as the "New Eve" (La Nueva Eva). The image depicts the 1469 apparition, with the Virgin standing on a thorn bush with a small quadrilateral bell hanging from it. It includes the statue of Rodrigo de Balzategui in a kneeling position.

The image is known for its controversial artistic posture. While the original image in the Sanctuary of Arantzazu in Oñate, Spain, is a seated Madonna, the image in San Mateo is depicted standing up. A similar reconstructed once more in 1990, when its controversy was officially settled by the Diocese of Antipolo in 2012 by the decision of the Bishop-Emeritus Gabriel Reyes. The image retained its standing posture, as per local custom and wishes of its devotees.

Veneration 
The image was granted an Episcopal Coronation on 9 November 2013 by the Bishop of Antipolo, Gabriel V. Reyes, while the coronation ceremony was officiated by Reverend Francisco M. de León, D.D. 
 
The Canonical Coronation of the image was granted in response to the petition made by the community through the  parish priest Father Lawrence C. Paz (deceased) with documents prepared by the Cofradia de Nuestra Señora de Aránzazu. The decree was promulgated on 17 June 2016 by Prefect of the Congregation for Divine Worship and the Discipline of the sacraments, Cardinal Robert Sarah. The coronation was held on 31 May 2017. With Reverend Francisco M. De Leon, D.D as the mass celebrant, and Archbishop Orlando Cardinal Quevedo as the crowning prelate in behalf of Pope Francis.

Devotion 
The feast day of the image is celebrated every September 9 with much solemnity and joy as people carry her image in procession while waving white handkerchiefs and singing her hymn. Her feast day was formerly celebrated every Sunday or the Sunday nearest Pentecost until it was discovered by then parish priest Rev. Fr. Marcelino Prudente that in Oñate, her feast is on September 9. Through his efforts, Protacio Gungon, then the Bishop of Antipolo, declared in 1989 that the feast of the Virgin will be kept on its present date. Today, the shrine devotes the ninth day and second Saturday of each month to the Virgin of Aránzazu.

The devotion to Nuestra Señora de Aránzazu continues to inspire the people of San Mateo to strive for their faith. Miracles continued to be reported through her intercession up to the present and pilgrims from around the country make a pilgrimage to her shrine to seek her intercession.

Miracles 
Thousand of devotees offer testimonials of miracles through the intercession of the Virgin of Aránzazu. One of the most popular is when during one typhoon season in the country, San Mateo was in danger of flooding that it was decided to bring out the image of the Virgin from her shrine and to be brought in every area in San Mateo. It is said that once the Virgin faced each household or area, the floods suddenly subsided. Another case was during the Typhoon Yolanda that would also threaten Rizal area and it was at that time the Episcopal Coronation of Nuestra Senora de Aránzazu will take place. Heavy rain downpour was looming in the area yet when the Virgin arrived for her Episcopal Coronation, the rain suddenly stopped and the coronation ceremony took place.

Other miracles from her devotees were recorded by the shrine and can be seen in the prayer chapel of the Virgin from cures from different diseases like cancer, passing of qualifying examinations for different professions, financial aids, reconciliation of families, conversion of non believers among others that the people of San Mateo gave their loving devotion and affection to their beloved patroness over the centuries.

Gallery

See also
Roman Catholicism in the Philippines
Marian apparition
St. Joseph Church (Baras, Rizal)
Our Lady of the Abandoned
Our Lady of La Naval, a similar Marian image enshrined in Quezon City.

References

External links
 
 

Aranzazu
Catholic Church in the Philippines
Religion in Rizal
Titles of Mary
Statues of the Madonna and Child